Marinella Canclini (born 27 February 1974) is an Italian short track speed skater. She competed at the 1992, 1994, 1998 and the 2002 Winter Olympics.

References

External links
 

1974 births
Living people
Italian female short track speed skaters
Olympic short track speed skaters of Italy
Short track speed skaters at the 1992 Winter Olympics
Short track speed skaters at the 1994 Winter Olympics
Short track speed skaters at the 1998 Winter Olympics
Short track speed skaters at the 2002 Winter Olympics
Sportspeople from the Province of Sondrio
20th-century Italian women
21st-century Italian women